Xavier Barsalou-Duval  (born November 10, 1988) is a Canadian politician who was elected to represent the riding of Pierre-Boucher—Les Patriotes—Verchères in the House of Commons in the 2015 federal election.

He was president of the Forum jeunesse du Bloc Québécois from 2011 to 2015 and campaigned for Mario Beaulieu in the 2014 leadership race.

He was elected with the lowest percentage of the vote of any Member of Parliament in 2015, gaining only 28.6% of the vote due to vote splitting and a close race in his riding.

Barsalou-Duval was one of three Bloc MPs who supported Martine Ouellet's leadership during a caucus revolt and remained with the Bloc caucus when seven MPs resigned on February 28, 2018 to sit as Independents.

He is married to fellow Bloc MP Marilène Gill.

Electoral record

References

External links
 http://www.blocquebecois.org/depute-xavier-barsalou-duval/ 

Living people
Members of the House of Commons of Canada from Quebec
Bloc Québécois MPs
1988 births
Université du Québec à Trois-Rivières alumni
Canadian auditors
Canadian educators
People from Boucherville
French Quebecers
21st-century Canadian politicians